Missulena torbayensis is a species of spider belonging to the family Actinopodidae. The spider is endemic to southwest Western Australia.

References

torbayensis
Spiders of Australia
Spiders described in 1996